Perennis (Latin, 'perennial'), may refer to:
 Perennial philosophy (Latin: philosophia perennis)
 Tigidius Perennis (died 185), a prefect of the Roman imperial bodyguard

See also 

 Perennial (disambiguation)
 List of Roman cognomina